John Chipman Farrar (February 25, 1896 – November 5, 1974) was an American editor, writer, and publisher. Farrar founded two publishing companies — Farrar & Rinehart and Farrar, Straus and Giroux. He also conceived and founded the Breadloaf Writers' Conference in 1926.

Life
Farrar was born in Burlington, Vermont. After serving in World War I as an aviation inspector, he graduated in 1919 from Yale University, where he contributed to campus humor magazine The Yale Record and was a member of Skull and Bones. In that year his book Forgotten Shrines was awarded the Yale Younger Poets Prize.
 
He became editor of The Bookman, up to its 1927 purchase by Seward Collins. Going into publishing, he worked for two years at Doubleday, Doran and Company. Then in 1929 he was a founder of the house of Farrar & Rinehart, with Stanley M. Rinehart Jr. and Frederick R. Rinehart, sons of Mary Roberts Rinehart who had also been at Doubleday Doran.

During the Second World War, Farrar took a post in the Office of War Information’s Overseas News and Features Bureau. Farrar soon took a leave of absence to serve overseas. He spent several months in the Mediterranean, where, as the Allies advanced on Italy and North Africa, he took charge of Psychological Warfare in Algeria. Upon Farrar's return from Algeria he spent the rest of 1945 winding down his work on the army magazines known as Victory and America.Hothouse: The Art of Survival and the Survival of Art at America's Most Celebrated Publishing House, Farrar, Straus, and Giroux

Later, after war work in World War II, he was a founder of Farrar, Straus and Giroux. Also, he is considered to be influential in the successful establishment of the Bread Loaf Writers' Conference at Middlebury College in Middleburg, Vermont.
According to Frances Stonor Saunders (Who Paid the Piper? The CIA and the Cultural Cold War, p. 242) Farrar also played a role in Cord Meyer's appointment of John Hunt to replace the Congress for Cultural Freedom's ailing head Michael Josselson. Farrar recommended Hunt for his "executive ability, a careful head and a sense of mission for the things we all believe in."
His work appeared in Harper's.

In 1926, Farrar married crossword puzzle pioneer Margaret Petherbridge.

Farrar died in New York City.  He is buried at Lakeside Cemetery in Burlington, Vermont.

Works
Portraits Yale prize poem, Yale University Press, 1916

Gold-Killer: A Mystery of the New Underworld, as John Prosper, with Prosper Buranelli New York: Doran 1922
The Bookman Anthology of Essays, editor, George H. Doran company, 1923
Songs for Johnny-Jump-Up, R.R. Smith, Inc., 1930

Anthologies

References

External links
 
 
 
 
 John C. Farrar obituary, Time (November 18, 1974)
 
John Chipman Farrar Papers. Yale Collection of American Literature, Beinecke Rare Book and Manuscript Library.

American publishers (people)
American book publishing company founders
20th-century American poets
20th-century American male writers
American male poets
Writers from Burlington, Vermont
Yale Younger Poets winners
The Yale Record alumni
1896 births
1974 deaths